{{DISPLAYTITLE:C10H11NO3}}
The molecular formula C10H11NO3 (molar mass: 193.20 g/mol, exact mass: 193.0739 u) may refer to:

 Actarit
 Betamipron
 Methylenedioxycathinone
 Methylhippuric acid